Johannes de Peyster or Johannes de Peyster II (September 21, 1666 – September 25, 1711) was the 23rd Mayor of New York City between 1698 and 1699.

Early life
Johannes was born in New York City in 1666 to Johannes and Cornelia Lubberts de Peyster.  Johannes's brother Abraham de Peyster served as mayor from 1691 to 1694, and his sister, Maria De Peyster, was married to David Provost.

In 1695, he was a Captain with the 2nd Battalion, Company of Foot, New York.

Career
De Peyster was Assessor of New York from 1692 to 1693, the Assistant Alderman of New York 1694 to 1696, a member of Provincial Legislature, and served as the 23rd Mayor of New York City between 1698 and 1699. While mayor, the first Trinity Church was built, the first Anglican Church in New York City, after Governor Fletcher's request was approved by King William III. He was succeeded as mayor by his brother-in law, David Provost.

In addition to his stint as mayor, he served in the colonial assembly.

Personal life
Johannes married Anna Bancker (1670–1740), an Albany native and the daughter of Gerrit Bancker, a pioneer fur trader, and Elizabeth Van Epps. Anna was the younger sister of Evert Bancker, the 3rd and 12th Mayor of Albany, New York. Together they had:
Johannes de Peyster (1689–1693), who died aged 3
Gerardus de Peyster (1691–1694), who died aged 3
Elizabeth de Peyster (1692–1760), who married James Beekman (1687–1730)
Johannes de Peyster III (1694–1789), who served as mayor of Albany and married Anna Schuyler (1697–1750), daughter of Myndert Schuyler and Rachel Cuyler.
Cornelia de Peyster (1695–1753), who was married to Matthew Clarkson (1699–1739) and Gilbert Tennent (1703–1764),
Gerardus de Peyster (b. 1697), who married Eva van Nuys Ouke
Anna de Peyster (1700–1735)
William de Peyster (1701–1701), who died young
Abraham de Peyster (b. 1704)
Maria de Peyster (b. 1706), who married Gerard Bancker in 1731.
William de Peyster (1709–1784), who married Margareta Roosevelt (1709–1776), daughter of Johannes Roosevelt
Catharina de Peyster (b. 1711), who married Hendrick Rutgers (1712–1779)

According to some sources, Johannes was known as "Johannes de Peyster II" and his son as "III".

Descendants
His grandsons include Gerard Bancker (1740–1799), New York State Treasurer from 1778 to 1798, and Henry Rutgers (1745–1830), namesake of Rutgers College.  His granddaughters, Anna de Peyster (1723–1794) and Rachel de Peyster, married New York State Senator Volkert P. Douw (who served in the 9th New York State Legislature) and Tobias Ten Eyck, respectively.

References

1666 births
1711 deaths
De Peyster family
Mayors of New York City
Members of the New York General Assembly